Gabriel Castillo (born 24 April 2001) is a Bolivian swimmer. He competed in the men's 100 metre backstroke at the 2020 Summer Olympics.

References

External links

2001 births
Living people
Bolivian male swimmers
Olympic swimmers of Bolivia
Swimmers at the 2020 Summer Olympics
Place of birth missing (living people)
Pan American Games competitors for Bolivia
Swimmers at the 2019 Pan American Games
21st-century Bolivian people